Eudendrium arbuscula is a marine species of cnidaria, a hydroid (Hydrozoa) in the family Eudendriidae.

Distribution
This species can be found in the Mediterranean Sea, northwest Atlantic Ocean and in European waters.

References

Eudendrium
Animals described in 1859